Lisandro Arbizu (born September 29, 1971 in Buenos Aires) is an Argentine rugby union footballer. He plays at fly-half or inside centre. He began playing for the local traditional club Belgrano Athletic Club and was one of the first Argentine players to migrate into the professional rugby in Europe.

He played with four clubs in France: CA Brive, CA Bordeaux-Bègles Gironde, Section Paloise and Aviron Bayonnais. As of the 2006-07 season, he plays for Italian club Gran Parma Rugby.

At only 19 years of age he made his debut against Ireland in October 1990 and has been with Los Pumas since. In 1992 against Spain, he became the country's youngest captain ever at the age of 21. Has earned 86 caps for his national side and has 184 test points (17 tries, 14 penalties, 11 drops and 14 goals). He played in three Rugby World Cup's, in 1991, 1995 and 1999, and missed his chance in 2003 due to injury.

Statistics
Tests: 86

2005: 11/6 vs. Italy (1 try); 17/6 vs. Italy

2003: 14/6: vs. France; 20/6: vs. France (1 Drop); 23/8: vs. United States; 30/8 vs. Canada.

2002: 15/6: vs. France; 2/11: vs. Australia; 16/11: vs. Italy; 23/11: vs. Ireland;

2001: 23/6: vs. New Zealand (1 try); 14/7: vs. Italy; 10/11: vs. Wales; 18/11: vs. Scotland; 1/12: vs. New Zealand (2 tries);

2000: 17/6: vs. Australia; 24/6: vs. Australia; 12/11: vs. South Africa; 25/11: vs. England;

1999: 5/6: vs. Wales; 12/6: vs. Wales; 21/8: vs. Scotland; 28/8: vs. Ireland; RWC: 1/10: vs. Wales; 10/10: vs. Samoa; 16/10: vs. Japan; 20/10: vs. Ireland; 24/10: vs. France (1 Try);

1998: 13/6: vs. France (2 Penalties and 1 goal); 20/6: vs. France (3 Penalties and 1 Drop); 8/8: vs. Romania (1 Try); 15/8: vs. United States; 22/8: vs. Canada; 7/11: vs. Italy 14/11: vs. France (3 Penalties); 21/11: vs. Wales;

1997: 31/5: vs. England (1 Try); 7/6: vs. England; 21/6: vs. New Zealand; 28/6: vs. New Zealand; 18/10: vs. Romania; 22/10: vs. Italy; 26/10: vs. France (1 Penalty and 1 Drop); 1/11: vs. Australia; 8/11: vs. Australia;

1996: 8/6: vs. Uruguay; 14/9: vs. United States; 18/9: vs. Uruguay; 21/9: vs. Canada; 9/11: vs. South Africa; 16/11: vs. South Africa; 14/12: vs. England;

1995: 24/9: vs. Paraguay; 30/9: vs. Chile; 8/10: vs. Uruguay; 14/10: vs. Romania; 17/10: vs. Italy; 21/10: vs. France; RWC: 27/5: vs. England (1 Try, 2 Penalties and 1 goal); 30/5: vs. Samoa; 4/6: vs. Italy; 30/4: vs. Australia (1 Goal); 6/5: vs. Australia; (1 try); 4/3: vs. Uruguay;

1993: 15/5: vs. Japan (1 Try); 22/5: vs. Japan (1 Try); 2/10: vs. Brazil; 11/10: vs. Chile (2 Penalties and 7 Goals); 16/10: vs. Paraguay (1 Try); 23/10: vs. Uruguay; 6/11: vs. South Africa; 13/11: vs. South Africa (1 Drop);

1992: 4/7: vs. France (1 Drop); 11/7: vs. France (1 Drop); 26/9: vs. Spain (1 Try); 25/10: vs. Spain; 31/10: vs. Romania; 14/11: vs. France (1 Drop);

1991: 6/7: vs. New Zealand; 13/7: vs. New Zealand; 15/8: vs. Chile (2 Drops); RWC: 4/10: vs. Australia (2 Drops); 9/10: vs. Wales; 13/10: vs. Samoa (1 Penalty and 1 Goal);

1990: 27/10: vs. Ireland; 10/11: vs. Scotland;

External links
 Key player: Lisandro Arbizu
 No fourth RWC for Arbizu

1971 births
Argentine rugby union players
Rugby union fly-halves
Living people
Rugby union players from Buenos Aires
Expatriate rugby union players in France
Argentina international rugby union players
Argentine expatriate sportspeople in France
Argentine expatriate sportspeople in Italy
Argentine expatriate rugby union players
Argentine people of Spanish descent
Argentine people of Basque descent
Expatriate rugby union players in Italy
Argentina international rugby sevens players
Male rugby sevens players
Aviron Bayonnais players
CA Brive players
Section Paloise players
CA Bordeaux-Bègles Gironde players